Alberico Archinto (8 November 1698 – 30 September 1758) — was an Italian cardinal and papal diplomat.

Biography
Archinto entered the Roman Curia in 1724. Twelve years later he was ordained to the priesthood, and on 1 November 1739 received episcopal consecration as titular archbishop of Nicea. Then he served as papal nuncio in Grand Duchy of Tuscany (1739–1746) and in Poland (1746–1754). He returned to Rome in 1754 and assumed the posts of governor of Rome and vice-camerlengo of the Church. In 1756 Pope Benedict XIV created him Cardinal and named him Secretary of State and Vice-Chancellor of the Holy Roman Church. He participated in the Papal conclave, 1758; he was considered papabile and received several votes in the early ballots. He died shortly after the election of Pope Clement XIII, who confirmed him as Secretary of State and Vice-Chancellor.

References

External links
 Biographical entry

Apostolic Nuncios to Tuscany
18th-century Italian cardinals
1698 births
1758 deaths
Apostolic Nuncios to Poland
Cardinal Secretaries of State